Encounter in Salzburg is a 1964 French-West German drama film directed by Max Friedmann and starring Curd Jürgens, Nadia Gray and Viktor de Kowa.

A rich man visits the Salzburg Festival, watches Jedermann, and dies.

The film's sets were designed by the art director Jean d'Eaubonne.

Plot
West Germany, in the early 1960s: Hans Willke is the industrial manager of the Terstappen works with 6,000 employees. His life, characterized by duty and responsibility, has been geared almost entirely to his job and he neglects his wife. After the death of her twins, she withdrew completely into herself. Willke has the feeling that he is missing out on something in real life. He spontaneously decides to go to Salzburg to see his old friend, the actor Bernhard von Wangen. He is rehearsing the stage play "Jedermann" in Salzburg. In the evening he meets the young Manuela in a cellar bar. Willke falls in love with the young woman and wants to enjoy life again. Suddenly, Willke's existence seems pointless, the sacrifice for his job a waste. As he plunges headlong into his new life, his body rebels. The heart stops and lets the stumbled person live through their concerns and doubts intensively. In the end, he suffers a fatal heart attack.

Cast
 Curd Jürgens as Hans Wilke, General Director
 Nadia Gray as Felicitas Wilke
 Viktor de Kowa as Bernhard von Wangen
 Walter Giller as Kröner, Insurance Agent
 Danièle Gaubert as Manuela
 Paul Dahlke as Insurance Director
 Marte Harell as Fräulein Niederalt, Secretary
 Alexander Allerson as Mahlke
 Maurice Bernard as Preetz
 Günther Jerschke as Direktor Wechsel
 Eduard Linkers
 Armand Mestral as Dr. Neubert
 Joachim Rake as Direktor Brähm
 Rolf von Nauckhoff as Hiesemann

References

Bibliography 
 Goble, Alan. The Complete Index to Literary Sources in Film. Walter de Gruyter, 1999.

External links 
 

1964 films
1964 drama films
German drama films
West German films
French drama films
1960s German-language films
Films set in Salzburg
Films about theatre
Films about businesspeople
Films about death
Everyman
1960s German films
1960s French films